ʿAbd is an Arabic word meaning one who is subordinated as a slave or a servant, and it means also to worship. The word can also be transliterated into English as 'Abd, where the apostrophe indicates the ayin, denoting a voiced pharyngeal fricative consonant or some reflex of it. In Western ears, it may be perceived as a guttural 'a' sound.

It appears in many common Arab names followed by Al (the) in form of "Abd ul", "Abd ul-", etc.; this is also commonly transliterated as "el-," in the form "Abd el-", meaning "servant of the-". This is always followed by one of the names for God.  These names are given in List of Arabic theophoric names and 99 Names of God.

A widespread name Abdullah (name) (or ʿAbd Allah) means "servant of God" or "worshipper of God".

 Abd Rabbuh ("slave of his Lord" or "servant of his Lord")
 Abduh ("His slave" or "His servant")

It can also refer to humans, such as:

 Abdul Nabi ("slave of the Prophet" or "servant of the Prophet")
 Abdul Zahra (slave of Fatimah—daughter of Muhammad)
 Abdul Hussein (slave of Hussein—grandson of Muhammad)

It can also be used by Arab Christians and Arabic-speaking Christians, just as long as it is associated to their religion:

 Abdul Masih ("slave of the Messiah" or "servant of the Messiah")
 Abdul Salib ("slave of the Cross" or "servant of the Cross")
 Abdul Shahid ("slave of the Martyr [i.e. Jesus Christ]" or "servant of the Martyr")
 Abd Yasu ("slave of Jesus" or "servant of Jesus")
 Abida
 Abidi

Abdullah can be also used by Arab Christians, as they refer to God as Allah.

Further notes
ʿĀbid is a given name meaning "worshipper". It is based on the Arabic word "ʿIbādah", i.e. "worship". The female version of the name is ʿĀbidah.

The Hebrew cognate word with Abd is "ʻEved" (עבד), meaning slave.

See also

From the same word family
From the word family based on the root 'abd:
 Abeed/abīd, the plural of ʿabd, used as a slur for Black people
 Ibadah, service or servitude
 'ubeid/ubeid/ubaid/Al-Ubaid, a diminutive derivate of 'abd, meaning "little slave/servant"
 Ubeidiya, place-name derived from ʿubeid
 Ubayd Allah, also as Obaidullah/Obaydullah/Obeidallah/Ubaydullah, name that means "little servant of God"

Other words
 Ghulam
 Qul (Turkic)

Other
 Arabic names
 Black Guard
 Islamic views on slavery

References

Arabic words and phrases
Islam and slavery
Islamic terminology
Slavery